Taste receptor type 1 member 1 is a protein that in humans is encoded by the TAS1R1 gene.

Structure 

The protein encoded by the TAS1R1 gene is a G protein-coupled receptor with seven trans-membrane domains and is a component of the heterodimeric amino acid taste receptor T1R1+3. This receptor is formed as a dimer of the TAS1R1 and TAS1R3 proteins. Moreover, the TAS1R1 protein is not functional outside of formation of the 1+3 heterodimer. The TAS1R1+3 receptor has been shown to respond to L-amino acids but not to their D-enantiomers or other compounds. This ability to bind L-amino acids, specifically L-glutamine, enables the body to sense the umami, or savory, taste. Multiple transcript variants encoding several different isoforms have been found for this gene, which may account for differing taste thresholds among individuals for the umami taste. Another interesting quality of the TAS1R1 and TAS1R2 proteins is their spontaneous activity in the absence of the extracellular domains and binding ligands. This may mean that the extracellular domain regulates function of the receptor by preventing spontaneous action as well as binding to activating ligands such as L-glutamine.

Ligands 

The umami taste is distinctly related to the compound monosodium glutamate (MSG).  Synthesized in 1908 by Japanese chemist Kikunae Ikeda, this flavor-enhancing compound led to the naming of a new flavor quality that was named “umami”, the Japanese word for “tasty”. The TAS1R1+3 taste receptor is sensitive to the glutamate in MSG as well as the synergistic taste-enhancer molecules inosine monophosphate (IMP) and guanosine monophosphate (GMP).  These taste-enhancer molecules are unable to activate the receptor alone, but are rather used to enhance receptor responses to many L-amino acids.

Signal transduction 

TAS1R1 and TAS1R2 receptors have been shown to bind to G proteins, most often the gustducin Gα subunit, although a gustducin knock-out has shown small residual activity. TAS1R1 and TAS1R2 have also been shown to activate Gαo and Gαi. This suggests that TAS1R1 and TAS1R2 are G protein-coupled receptors that inhibit adenylyl cyclases to decrease cyclic guanosine monophosphate (cGMP) levels in taste receptors.

Research done by creating knock-outs of common channels activated by sensory G-protein second messenger systems has also shown a connection between umami taste perception and the phosphatidylinositol (PIP2) pathway.  The nonselective cation Transient Receptor Potential channel TRPM5 has been shown to correlate with both umami and sweet taste.  Also, the phospholipase PLCβ2 was shown to similarly correlate with umami and sweet taste.  This suggests that activation of the G-protein pathway and subsequent activation of PLC β2 and the TRPM5 channel in these taste cells functions to activate the cell.

Location and innervation 

TAS1R1+3 expressing cells are found mostly in the fungiform papillae at the tip and edges of the tongue and palate taste receptor cells in the roof of the mouth.  These cells are shown to synapse upon the chorda tympani nerves to send their signals to the brain, although some activation of the glossopharyngeal nerve has been found. TAS1R and TAS2R (bitter) channels are not expressed together in taste buds.

See also
 Taste receptor
 TAS1R2
 TAS1R3

References

Further reading

External links
 TAS1R1 Gene
 TASTE RECEPTOR TYPE 1, MEMBER 1; TAS1R1

Human taste receptors